Emergency is a Philippine television documentary show broadcast by GMA Network. Originally hosted by Edu Manzano, it premiered on October 4, 1995. Arnold Clavio served as the host from 1996 to 2009. The show concluded on March 6, 2009 for 13 years with a total of 635 episodes. It was replaced by OFW Diaries in its timeslot.

Premise 
The show features reports on natural calamities, man-made disasters, diseases, advancements in the medical field, successful operations of men in uniform, rescue operations of emergency response teams, safety tips, stories on heroic deeds of ordinary people and institutions and numerous other life-threatening situations. It also featured anniversary specials  and reports regarding major issues, such as child labor.

Hosts
 Edu Manzano 
 Arnold Clavio

Accolades

References

External links
 

1995 Philippine television series debuts
2009 Philippine television series endings
English-language television shows
Filipino-language television shows
GMA Network original programming
GMA Integrated News and Public Affairs shows
Philippine documentary television series